Kranti Shah is the Founder, Director and Managing Trustee of Yuvak Biradari (Bharat) which is a voluntary, social, educational, cultural and youth movement of India. He has championed the cause of social welfare and youth development since 1974.

He was awarded the Padma Shri by Govt. of India in 2010 in the field of Social work

Biography

He comes from an illustrious family of freedom fighters and philanthropist-businessman of Sangli in Maharashtra. He is a Graduate from Fergusson College, Pune. His own public life began during his school days when he was actively involved in Rashtra Seva Dal, then with Sane Guruji's Antar Bharati movement and later he was elected as President of the Maharashtra Students’ Council. He proceeded to set up a Coffee Club for youngsters to engage in social reconstruction. At the time he led disaster relief and rehabilitation work in the 60's and 70's for Koyna earthquake victims, Bangladeshi refugees in the aftermath of the Indo-Pak war as well as in the drought and famine struck regions. As his work shaped up over time, he founded the organisation Yuvak Biradari in 1974.

Over the years under his leadership, Yuvak Biradari's awareness campaigns (long marches) have traversed 35,000 km through padayatra or cycle yatra by hundreds of youngsters and artists across 22 Indian states and were titled as Jodo Bharat Yatra (National Integration and brotherhood), Shanti Yatra (Peace marches), Vasundhara Bachao Abhiyaan (Save the Earth through environment protection), Swachhata Abhiyaan (Cleanliness and Hygiene) and Kanya Bachao Abhiyaan (Save the girl child) among others. A few examples of these marches are: ‘Ba se Bapu’ (from Pune-2 October to Delhi-14 November 1984), Sabarmati se Brahmaputra (from Ahmedabad-31 October to Guwahati-31 December 1989 and Shilong-12 January 1989), Mandovi se Yamuna (Panaji-18 December 1998 to Delhi-30 January 1999), Dandi Smriti Sankalp Abhiyaan (75 towns of Maharashtra and Gujarat from 11 March – 6 April 2005) etc. In the last three decades more than one lakh trees have been planted with volunteers in different regions. He conceptualised the Ek Sur Ek Taal social and value education programme using the medium of music and till date 21 lakh students have been directly trained in India by their faculty. The social themes of Biradari's 2500 cultural presentations have created long lasting impressions on Indians. These have been ballet productions which were the brain child of Shah to raise social awareness and consciousness. He has organised numerous educational camps, self-employment workshops for rural youth for their economic empowerment, art workshops which have trained 20000 youth till date and developed a generation of responsible citizens. His organisation's relief and rehabilitation work for riot-hit, earthquake, flood and drought victims kindled hope among many groups. Cultural inter-state programmes organised by him across the length and breadth of India have been memorable events in the organisation's history. Seminars on issues relevant for social change, grassroot projects by youngsters, mentoring to hundreds of youth have been his continuous activities. During this journey, many national public figures from the fields of literature, art, social activism, politics, business and academia rendered support to his movement. Thousands of Biradars (members) from around 10 states of the nation were integrated in this long journey.

Awards and recognition
Shah was the recipient of Maharashtra Government's first Shiva Chhatrapati Yuva Award in 1983. Accolades to Yuvak Biradari (Bharat) like the ‘National Youth Award’ by the Government of India in 1993 and the ‘Indira Gandhi National Integration Award’ by the Government of Maharashtra in 1992 were recognitions for his lifetime's contribution. In 2010 he received the prestigious Padma Shri Award (social work) form the Government of India.

References

External links
 Yuvak Biradari, website

Indian children's rights activists
Recipients of the Padma Shri in social work
People from Sangli
Living people
20th-century Indian educational theorists
Activists from Maharashtra
Social workers from Maharashtra
Social workers
1944 births